Karl Rosario King-Nabors is a Republican member of the Northern Mariana Islands Senate.

Biography
His parents are William Nabors, an attorney who worked on the settlement of the Micronesian War Claims, and Serafina King, who served for a time as a member of the Northern Mariana Islands House of Representatives. He attended Tinian High School. He served on Commonwealth's COVID-19 Task Force as Tinian's representative. He ran for the Northern Mariana Islands Senate in the 2020 general election against Democratic candidate Frederick Dela Cruz.

He won and succeeded fellow Republican Francisco Borja. He was the chairman of the Senate committee reviewing the House's impeachment charges against Governor Ralph Torres. He, along with the other Senate Republicans, voted in acquit Torres of the charges.

References

Living people
Northern Mariana Islands Senators
Republican Party (Northern Mariana Islands) politicians
Year of birth missing (living people)